Alexandru Graur (July 9, 1900 – July 9, 1988) was a Romanian linguist.

Born into a Jewish family in Botoșani, Graur graduated from the Faculty of Letters of the University of Bucharest and the École Pratique des Hautes Études in Paris (1924–1929). He obtained a Doctor of Philosophy degree from the Sorbonne. After returning to Bucharest, he became involved in academic life and published studies in different periodicals.

Graur founded and was the principal (1941–1944) of the "Liceul particular evreiesc" (Jewish Private High School). In 1946 he started teaching at the university level. In 1955 he was named titular member of the Romanian Academy. Between 1954 and 1956 he was the Dean of the Faculty of Letters at the University of Bucharest. He wrote many papers and articles on classical philology and etymology. He had many contributions in the field of linguistics, phonetics and grammar of the Latin and Romanian languages.

In 1956, Graur, alongside Dean Iorgu Iordan, leading propagandist Leonte Tismăneanu, and the academics Mihai Novicov, Ion Coteanu, and Radu Florian, took part in a University inquiry into the anti-communist statements of Paul Goma, a university student who later became a noted dissident and writer. Led by Iordan and supervised by the Securitate, the investigation culminated in Goma's expulsion from the Faculty and his subsequent arrest.

He was married twice, the second time with Neaga Graur (1921–2005) in 1947, and they had a son, Dumitru (born 1947).

Published works
 Nom d'agent et adjectif en roumain, Champion, Paris, 1929
 La romanité du Roumain, Editura Academiei Române, Bucharest, 1965
 The Romance Character of Romanian, Editura Academiei Române, Bucharest, 1965
 Nume de persoane, București, Editura Ştiinţifică, Bucharest, 1965
 Tendințele actuale ale limbii române, Editura Științifică, Bucharest, 1968
 Scrieri de ieri și de azi, Editura Științifică, Bucharest, 1970
 Puțină... aritmetică, Editura Științifică, Bucharest, 1971
 Nume de locuri, Editura Științifică, Bucharest, 1972
 Gramatica azi, Editura Academiei Române, Bucharest, 1973
 Mic tratat de ortografie, Editura Științifică, Bucharest, 1974
 Dicționar al greșelilor de limbǎ, Editura Academiei Române, Bucharest, 1982
 Puțină gramatică, Editura Academiei Române, Bucharest, 1987

References 

1900 births
1988 deaths
20th-century Romanian people
20th-century linguists
Titular members of the Romanian Academy
Linguists from Romania
Romanian writers in French
Romanian schoolteachers
Romanian communists
Grammarians from Romania
Grammarians of Latin
Linguists of Romanian
Academic staff of the University of Bucharest
University of Bucharest alumni
University of Paris alumni
Romanian university and college faculty deans
Romanian expatriates in France
Romanian Jews
Moldavian Jews
People from Botoșani
Heads of schools in Romania